Tyrnavos 2005 Football Club is a Greek football club, based in Tyrnavos, Larissa regional unit.

They were champions of Group 4 of Delta Ethniki for 2009–10 season and promoted to Gamma Ethniki.

External links
 http://www.paetirnavosfc.gr/

Larissa (regional unit)
Football clubs in Thessaly
2005 establishments in Greece
Association football clubs established in 2005